Shang-a-Lang was a children's pop music TV series starring the Scottish band, the Bay City Rollers. It was produced in Manchester by Granada Television for the ITV network and ran for one 20-week series in 1975.

It featured the band in comedy sketches and performing their songs to a live studio audience made up of their teenage fans. This resulted in chaotic scenes at times as some members of the audience attempted to run onto the studio floor to meet their heroes, resulting in security officers having to forcibly restrain or even eject them from the studio.

Guest stars performing their latest releases and hits included Cliff Richard, Marc Bolan, Lynsey de Paul, Lulu, David Cassidy, Linda Lewis, Gary Glitter, Olivia Newton-John, Slade, Sparks, Alvin Stardust, Showaddywaddy, The Rubettes, Alan Price and Gilbert O'Sullivan and The Marionettes.

The show's theme song "Shang-a-Lang", was a hit single for the group, peaking at number 2 in 1974 in the UK Singles Chart.

References

External links
 

British variety television shows
1975 British television series debuts
1975 British television series endings
1970s British music television series
Television shows set in Manchester
Bay City Rollers
Television series by ITV Studios
English-language television shows
Television shows produced by Granada Television